Pirate Prude is the debut EP from American indie rock band Helium. It was released March 8, 1994, on Matador Records.  Its subject matter concerns prostitution.

Critical reception
AllMusic wrote that the EP "is an uncompromising introduction to Mary Timony's mix of radical feminism and warped pop sensibilities." Trouser Press wrote that "Timony’s wavering guitar shimmers and undulates across the surface of 'XXX' and 'OOO,' songs that are every bit as distinct as those titles would indicate."

Track listing
 "Baby Vampire Made Me" - 5:50
 "Wanna Be a Vampire Too, Baby" - 2:23
 "XXX" - 5:19
 "000" - 5:44
 "I'll Get You, I Mean It" - 2:21
 "Love $$$" - 5:42
 "[Surprise Ending]" - 1:16

Personnel
Mary Timony - Guitar, Vocals
Brian Dunton - Bass
Shawn King Devlin - Drums
Adam Lasus - Producer
Greg Calbi - Mastering
Greg Jacobs - Accordion
Carl Plaster - Drums
R.E.D. - Engineer

References

1994 debut EPs
Helium (band) albums
Matador Records EPs